Larga distancia is a 2019 Peruvian comedy-drama film directed by Franco Finocchiaro (in his directorial debut) and written by Finocchiaro and Jorge Ossio Seminario. Starring Miguel Iza.

Synopsis 
Astronauts, vampires and giant monsters destroying cities? What do these characters have in common? Well, Miguel, a fanciful office worker who has had his life on hold since Isabel, his wife, left him. However, he prefers to tell everyone that it is a temporary separation. He spends his days in an apartment with his daughter Camila, a withdrawn teenager whom he tries to get closer to but never fully understands.

One day, in Miguel's work center, it is announced that the worker with the highest sales quota at the end of the year will be rewarded with two tickets to any part of the world. Miguel sets out to win this prize to save his job and go to Isabel's. On the other hand, her teenage daughter Camila navigates an awkward and innocent love triangle between a confused skateboarder and her best friend.

Cast 
The actors participating in this film are:

 Miguel Iza as Miguel
 Valquiria Huerta as Camila
 Fiorella Pennano as Nina
 Victor Prada
 Denisse Arreguí
 Diego Pérez
 Ximena Palomino

Financing 
The film won the DAFO 2018 Post-Production Contest to start post-production.

Release 
Larga distancia had an initial premiere on August 12, 2019, at the 23rd edition of the Lima Film Festival. The film was scheduled to be released in May 2020 in Peruvian theaters, but it was canceled due to the COVID-19 pandemic. Finally, It was commercially released on January 20, 2022, in Peruvian theaters.

Awards

References

External links 

 

2019 films
2019 comedy-drama films
Peruvian comedy-drama films
2010s Spanish-language films
2010s Peruvian films
Films set in Peru
Films shot in Peru
Films about teenagers
Films about families
Films about father–daughter relationships
2019 directorial debut films
Films impacted by the COVID-19 pandemic